This article contains a list of writers who have been considered to be part of the Lost Generation. The Lost Generation includes people born between 1883 and 1900, and the term is generally applied to reference the work of these individuals during the 1920s.

Writers described as members of the Lost Generation
 Gertrude Stein
 F. Scott Fitzgerald
  T. S. Eliot
 Ezra Pound
 Sylvia Beach
 Ernest Hemingway
 Virgil Geddes
 Archibald MacLeish
 Hart Crane
 E. E. Cummings
 William Slater Brown
 Olaf Stapledon
 Sherwood Anderson
 John Dos Passos
 John Steinbeck
 Ford Madox Ford
 William Faulkner
 Thomas Wolfe
 Djuna Barnes
 Glenway Wescott
 Alan Seeger
 Edna St. Vincent Millay
 Edmund Wilson
 Henry Miller
 Malcolm Cowley
 Louis-Ferdinand Céline
 Erich Maria Remarque
 Aldous Huxley
 James Joyce
 Virginia Woolf
 J. R. R. Tolkien
 Dashiell Hammett
 John Allan Wyeth
 C. S. Lewis
 Boris Pasternak

Killed during World War I
 Rupert Brooke
 Wilfred Owen
 Isaac Rosenberg
 Alan Seeger
 Edward Thomas

Notes

References

Lists of writers
Lost Generation writers